Rudolf Kučera (born 23 January 1940) is a Czech retired footballer who played as a forward. He played his club football in Czechoslovakia, mainly for Dukla Prague, with whom he became joint top scorer of the 1960–61 Czechoslovak First League with 17 goals. He won three league titles with the club, as well as the Czechoslovak Cup in 1961.

Club career
Kučera played for TJ Gottwaldov before moving to Dukla Prague in 1959. Kučera scored the first competitive goal at Stadion Juliska, opening the scoring in a 2–1 win against Wiener SK in the 1960 Mitropa Cup. In the 1960–61 Czechoslovak First League, Dukla won the league, with Kučera's 17 goals tying Ladislav Pavlovič as joint top scorer. The club also won the Czechoslovak Cup the same season, earning "the double" in the process. Further league titles followed in 1961–62 and 1962–63. In the European Cup, Kučera scored 11 times in 14 matches, ranking him third highest goalscorer overall from Czechoslovak players in the pre-Champions League era of the competition behind Jozef Adamec and Ivan Mráz.

Kučera's career was ended through injury at the age of 23. In a 1963–64 European Cup match against Polish side Górnik Zabrze, Kučera was injured following an elbow to the head from defender Stanisław Oślizło and never played at the top level again.

International career
Kučera played internationally for Czechoslovakia, making his international debut at Dalymount Park in a 3–1 win for his country against Republic of Ireland in a World Cup qualifier on 8 October 1961. In total he scored three goals in seven appearances between 1961 and 1963, although he missed the 1962 FIFA World Cup due to injury. He also represented Czechoslovakia B on two occasions between 1961 and 1962.

International goals
Scores and results list Czechoslovakia's goal tally first.

Honours

Club
Dukla Prague
Czechoslovak First League (3): 1960–61, 1961–62, 1962–63.
Czechoslovak Cup (1): 1960–61

Individual
Czechoslovak First League top scorer: 1960–61 (shared)

References

Cited texts

External links

1940 births
Living people
People from Zlín District
Czech footballers
Czechoslovak footballers
Czechoslovakia international footballers
FC Fastav Zlín players
Dukla Prague footballers
Association football forwards
Sportspeople from the Zlín Region